Sendlinger Tor is an U-Bahn station in the city center of Munich at a junction of the lines U1/2/7 and U3/6 line of the Munich U-Bahn system. It was opened on 19 October 1971 (upper level, U3 and U6) and 18 October 1980 (lower level, U1, U2 and U7).

Gallery

See also

List of Munich U-Bahn stations

References

Munich U-Bahn stations
Railway stations in Germany opened in 1971
1971 establishments in West Germany